Ramchandra Rath (born 6 April 1945) is an Indian politician. He was elected to the Lok Sabha, the lower house of the Parliament of India as a member of the Indian National Congress.

References

External links
 Official biographical sketch in Parliament of India website

1945 births
Living people
Lok Sabha members from Odisha
India MPs 1977–1979
India MPs 1980–1984
India MPs 1991–1996
Indian National Congress politicians from Odisha
Utkal Congress politicians